Cindy Chupack is a screenwriter and film director who has won three Golden Globes and two Emmys for her work as a writer/executive producer of HBO's Sex and the City and writer/co-executive producer of ABC's Modern Family.

Early years
Chupack was born and raised in Tulsa, living there until she graduated from Edison High School. Although she moved away, and currently lives in California, she says she maintains close ties to high school girl friends, many of whom still live in Tulsa. She still credits her third-grade teacher, Virginia Davis, at Waite Phillips Elementary School, by praising her skill at writing. Chupack said in an interview that this encouraged her to pursue her dream of becoming a professional writer.

Career
Several episodes she penned—namely, Sex and the Citys "Evolution", "Attack of the 5'10" Woman", "Just Say Yes", "Plus One is the Loneliest Number", "I Love a Charade", and "Splat!", and Modern Familys "Little Bo Bleep"—were individually nominated for Writer's Guild and/or Emmy awards. Chupack also worked on Everybody Loves Raymond as a writer/co-executive producer.

In May 2010, NBC announced it had commenced production of Love Bites, a television series created by Chupack for the NBC network.

Her first book, The Between Boyfriends Book, was published by St. Martin's Press. Her second book, a comic memoir about marriage entitled The Longest Date: Life as a Wife, was published by Viking in January 2014. She has also written humorous essays for The New York Times, Real Simple, Harper's Bazaar, People, Allure, Slate, and Glamour.

In April 2018, it was announced Chupack would make her directorial debut on Otherhood, with Patricia Arquette, Angela Bassett and Felicity Huffman starring.

Personal life
Chupack is from Tulsa, Oklahoma. She received a journalism degree from Northwestern University in Evanston, Illinois where she was a member of Kappa Alpha Theta.

Chupack now lives in Marina del Rey, California.

See also
List of awards and nominations received by Sex and the City

References

External links

Official website
NYTimes autobiographical article

Film directors from Oklahoma
Television producers from California
American women television producers
American television writers
Medill School of Journalism alumni
Living people
People from Tulsa, Oklahoma
People from Marina del Rey, California
Writers from Tulsa, Oklahoma
American women screenwriters
American women television writers
American women film directors
Year of birth missing (living people)
Screenwriters from Oklahoma
21st-century American women